Peniel may refer to:

Places
 Peniel (biblical), mentioned in Genesis 32

United Kingdom 
 Peniel, Carmarthenshire, West Wales
 Peniel, Denbighshire, North Wales
 Peniel Green, Swansea, South Wales
 Peniel Pentecostal Church, England

United States 
 Peniel Mission, California
 Peniel Missionary Society, California
 Peniel, Texas
 Peniel, West Virginia

India 
 Peniel, Manipur

People
 Peniel E. Joseph (born 1972), American historian and commentator on racial issues
 Peniel Mlapa (born 1988), Togolese footballer
 Peniel Shin (born 1993), American singer, member of the South Korean boy group BTOB

See also
 Pineal gland, a small endocrine gland in the brain of most vertebrates